Carlos Bustamante is a Canadian television personality, who has been an entertainment reporter for Entertainment Tonight Canada since 2017. Prior to joining ET Canada he was a host of programming for YTV, including The Zone (2002–2018) and The Next Star.

Early life 
Born in Manila, Philippines, Bustamante moved to Canada at a young age, with his family first settling in Calgary, Alberta. After a few years, his family lived between Vancouver and Toronto. Bustamante also lived in Burlington, Ontario, and was a tap dancer in his youth.

Awards 
Bustamante won the Canadian Screen Award for Best Host in a Pre-School, Children's or Youth Program or Series at the 2nd Canadian Screen Awards in 2014 for The Next Star, and was a nominee in the same category at the 3rd Canadian Screen Awards in 2015. He was a dual nominee at the 10th Canadian Screen Awards in 2022, receiving nods for Host of a Talk Show or Entertainment News Program alongside Cheryl Hickey and Sangita Patel for the ET Canada Favourite Canadian Countdown, and Host in a Web Program or Series alongside Hickey, Patel, Roz Weston, Keshia Chanté and Morgan Hoffman for ET Canada Live.

References

External links

Canadian television hosts
Canadian infotainers
Canadian people of Filipino descent
Canadian male dancers
People from Burlington, Ontario
Living people
Canadian Screen Award winners
Year of birth missing (living people)